is a Shingon temple in Ōtsu in Japan's Shiga Prefecture. This temple is the thirteenth of the Kansai Kannon Pilgrimage.

History

It was constructed around 747 CE, and is said to have been founded by Rōben. The temple contains a number of cultural assets. The temple possesses two fragments of manuscripts of the Records of the Grand Historian (Shiji 史記), the first of China's 24 dynastic histories, which are the only known extant fragments that pre-date the Tang dynasty (618907).  According to literature available at the temple complex, the guardian carvings at Sanmon/Todaimon are by Tankei and Unkei. Allegedly, Murasaki Shikibu began writing The Tale of Genji at Ishiyama-dera during a full moon night in August 1004. In commemoration, the temple maintains a Genji room featuring a life-size figure of Lady Murasaki and displays a statue in her honor.

The temple features as "The Autumn Moon at Ishiyama" in the Eight Views of Ōmi thematic series in art and literature; examples include ukiyo-e prints by Harunobu in the 18th century and Hiroshige in the 19th century.

See also
 Glossary of Japanese Buddhism - For an explanation of the terms on Japanese Buddhism, Japanese Buddhist art, and Japanese Buddhist temple architecture.
 List of National Treasures of Japan (temples)
 List of National Treasures of Japan (ancient documents)
 List of National Treasures of Japan (writings)

References

Sources

Kōjien, 5th edition

8th-century Buddhist temples
Tōji Shingon temples
Buddhist temples in Shiga Prefecture
Buildings and structures in Ōtsu
National Treasures of Japan
Important Cultural Properties of Japan
Pagodas in Japan
Religious buildings and structures completed in 747